The puna ground tyrant (Muscisaxicola juninensis) is a species of bird in the family Tyrannidae.
It is found in Argentina, Bolivia, Chile, and Peru.
Its natural habitats are subtropical or tropical high-altitude grassland and swamps.

References 

puna ground tyrant
Birds of the Puna grassland
puna ground tyrant
puna ground tyrant
Taxonomy articles created by Polbot